Trematon is a village in Cornwall, England, UK, accessible via the A38 and about two miles (3 km) from the town of Saltash and part of the civil parish of St Stephens-by-Saltash.

History
Trematon appears in the Domesday Book (1086) as the manor of "Tremetone", at 100 households it was one of the very largest settlements in Cornwall and West Devon, larger even than nearby St Germans.

William Camden says of Trematon 

Trematon Castle, one and a half miles south-east of the village, stands in a sentinel position overlooking Plymouth Sound and dates from soon after the Norman conquest. It is similar in style to Restormel, being a motte-and-bailey castle with a 12th-century keep. It was built on the ruins of an earlier Roman fort.

William Hals wrote that Caddock the son of Condor of Cornwall's "chief dwelling and place of residence was at Jutsworth, near Saltash and Trematon".

There was previously a Wesleyan Methodist chapel at Trematon.

There is a Cornish cross at a road junction between the village and the castle.

Present day
Trematon Castle exists to this day and can be visited. Trematon is left of Trehan and approx 25 minutes from Tamar Bridge. Trematon Hall, a Private Georgian Period country house is set in twenty-five acres of grounds. The village also has a pub called the Crooked Inn.

See also

Feudal barony of Trematon

References

External links

Villages in Cornwall
Manors in Cornwall